Ermineskin 138 is an Indian reserve of the Ermineskin Cree Nation in Alberta, located between Ponoka County and the County of Wetaskiwin No. 10. Part of the Maskwacis community, it is 13 kilometres south of Wetaskiwin.

References

Indian reserves in Alberta